Spinifex grass is a name which has been applied to two genera of grasses:
 Spinifex (coastal grass), a genus of grass which is indigenous to the coastal areas of Australasia and Indonesia
 Triodia (plant), a hummock grass of arid Australia, covering twenty percent of the Australian continent (although not in the genus Spinifex, it is the grass most commonly referred to as "spinifex")
 Spinifex resin, obtained from species of Triodia, not Spinifex